Nebria tenella is a species of black coloured ground beetle in the Nebriinae subfamily that can be found in Georgia and Russia.

Distribution
It can also be found in Kyafar-Agur river, of the same region.

Subspecies
The species bears 3 subspecies all of which are endemic to Caucasus:
Nebria tenella megrelica Shilenkov, 1983
Nebria tenella saridaghensis Shilenkov, 1983
Nebria tenella tenella Motschulsky, 1850

References

tenella
Beetles described in 1850
Beetles of Asia
Beetles of Europe